Axel Hirsoux (born 26 September 1982) is a Belgian singer. He represented Belgium in the Eurovision Song Contest 2014 in Copenhagen, Denmark with the song "Mother". In the final of the local pre-selection Eurosong, he received more than 50 percent of the televotes and 4 times the maximum of 12 points from the international jury.

Career

2013:  The Voice Belgique
In 2013, he participated in Walloon TV-talent-contests: and 'The Voice Belgique' (being eliminated in the second round).

2014–present: Eurovision Song Contest

In 2014 it was announced that Hirsoux would compete in Eurosong 2014, the Belgian national selection for the Eurovision Song Contest 2014 organised by the Belgian broadcaster Vlaamse Radio- en Televisieomroeporganisatie (VRT). He performed the song "Mother" during the first Casting Show, the song progressed to the Semi-final. On 9 March 2014 he performed during the third Semi-final, he progressed to the Final. The final of the competition took place on 16 March 2014 at the Sportpaleis in Antwerp. He was announced as the winner and would represent Belgium in the Eurovision Song Contest 2014 at the B&W Hallerne in Copenhagen, Denmark. During the semi-final allocation draw on 20 January 2014 at the Copenhagen City Hall, Belgium was drawn to compete in the second half of the first semi-final on 6 May 2014. The song failed to qualify from the first semi-final, placing 14th and scoring 28 points. After the contest on 7 July 2014 he released the single "Bellissimo". In November 2014 Hirsoux & Camille Beniest released the single "Because You Need Me". On 1 June 2015, he released the single "Haut l'humain".

Personal life
While in Copenhagen for the Eurovision Song Contest, Hirsoux told OUTtv he is married to a man.

Discography

Singles

References

Notes
A  Did not appear on the official Belgian Ultratop 50 chart, but rather on Ultratip chart, which combines "Airplay and Sales".

Sources

Eurovision Song Contest entrants for Belgium
Eurovision Song Contest entrants of 2014
Living people
English-language singers from Belgium
1982 births
Belgian LGBT singers
Belgian gay musicians
Gay singers
Articles containing video clips
21st-century Belgian male singers
21st-century Belgian singers
20th-century Belgian LGBT people
21st-century Belgian LGBT people